Dwaram Durga Prasad Rao, alternatively spelled Dwaram Durga Prasada Rao, is an Indian violinist of Carnatic music style, guru and music teacher from the state of Andhra Pradesh. For over fifty years, he has performed solo and as an accompanist in several music concerts. He received the Sangeet Natak Akademi Award, India's highest award in the arts, for his contributions to Carnatic music.

Early life 
Rao is from Vizianagaram. He has a brother, who is also a violinist.

Career 
Rao is an exponent of violin in Carnatic music style for at least 70 years . When he was 17 years old, Rao won a Carnatic music competition held by All India Radio. He accompanied his brother in several performances and also performed solo. He is a guru and teaches music. His violin playing was generally received favourably among critics and connoisseurs alike.

He worked as a lecturer for 22 years and later as the principal of Maharajah's Government College of Music and Dance in Vizianagaram for 18 years. For a brief time period, he had an apprenticeship with painter .

Awards 
Rao was conferred with the Sangeet Natak Akademi Award, India's highest civilian award in the field of arts, for the year 2014 in the Carnatic instrumental music category by the Sangeet Natak Akademi, overseen by the Government of India.

Family 
Durga Prasad Rao hails from a family of violinists. His grandfather Dwaram Venkataswamy Naidu was one of the most important Carnatic music violinists of the 20th century. Other renowned violinists include Naidu's brothers  and Dwaram Venkata Krishnaiah, daughter , son Dwaram Bhavanarayana Rao; Bhavanarayana Rao's daughter Dwaram Lakshmi; and Durga Prasad Rao's brother .

References 

Living people
Year of birth missing (living people)
People from Vizianagaram
Musicians from Andhra Pradesh
Indian violinists
20th-century Indian male musicians
21st-century Indian male musicians
Recipients of the Sangeet Natak Akademi Award